Amazon Watershed : the new environmental investigation is a 1991 book by British writer and environmental and political activist, George Monbiot.

Synopsis
The book is an investigation into the expulsion of peasants from their homes and their forced relocation to the Amazon. Military police attempt to kill Monbiot as he exposes a vast military project opening up the area to logging and deforestation. He tracks timber cut illegally from Indian reserves all the way back to retailers in the United Kingdom. According to the publishers, Monbiot also "examines the role of the British and American governments in promoting, wittingly or otherwise, this great ecological catastrophe".

Reception
The book won the Natural World Book Prize, described as "the premier environmental book prize in the UK" in 1991.

References

1991 non-fiction books
1991 in the environment
Books about Brazil
Books about imperialism
Books critical of capitalism
Environmental non-fiction books
Sustainability books
Non-fiction books about indigenous peoples of the Americas
Books about foreign relations of the United Kingdom
Books about foreign relations of the United States
Books by George Monbiot
Michael Joseph books
Investigative journalism